Higher Tremarcoombe is a hamlet in the parish of St Cleer, Cornwall, England.

References

Hamlets in Cornwall